Żabiak  is a settlement in the administrative district of Gmina Namysłów, within Namysłów County, Opole Voivodeship, in south-western Poland. 

References

Villages in Namysłów County